Trioceros harennae, the Harenna hornless chameleon, is a species of chameleon found in Ethiopia.

References

Trioceros
Reptiles described in 1995
Reptiles of Ethiopia